Ocellularia neoleucina is a species of corticolous (bark-dwelling) lichen in the family Graphidaceae. Found in southeastern Thailand, it was formally described as a new species in 2002 by lichenologists Natsurang Homchantara and Brian J. Coppins. The type specimen was collected from Namtok Phlio National Park (Chanthaburi Province); here, in a moist, lowland evergreen forest, it was found growing on Anisoptera costata. The lichen has a shiny, smooth, greenish thallus with a dense cortex and a white medulla with many crystals. Its ascospores are ellipsoid, thin walled, colourless, and typically measure 14.0–17.0 by 5.0–6.7 μm. It contains stictic acid, a secondary compound.

References

neoleucina
Lichen species
Lichens described in 2002
Lichens of Thailand
Taxa named by Brian John Coppins
Taxa named by Natsurang Homchantara